Colin George Blakely (23 September 1930 – 7 May 1987) was a Northern Irish actor. He had roles in the films A Man for All Seasons (1966), The Private Life of Sherlock Holmes (1970), Murder on the Orient Express (1974), and Equus (1977).

Early life
Born in Bangor, County Down, Northern Ireland, Blakely attended Sedbergh School in Yorkshire (now Cumbria), England. At the age of 18 he started work in his family's sports goods shop in Belfast, before going on to work as a timber-loader on the railways. In 1957, after a spell of amateur dramatics with the Bangor Drama Club, he turned professional with the Group Theatre, Belfast.

Career
In 1957, at the age of 27, Blakely made his stage debut as Dick McCardle in Master of the House. He also appeared in several Ulster Group Theatre productions, including Gerard McLarnon's Bonefire (1958) and Patricia O'Connor's A Sparrow Falls (1959). From 1957 to 1959 he was at the Royal Court Theatre, appearing in Cock-A-Doodle Dandy, Serjeant Musgrave's Dance and, to critical approval, The Naming of Murderers Rock. In 1961, he joined the Royal Shakespeare Company at Stratford-upon-Avon and from 1963 to 1968 was with the National Theatre at the Old Vic. On television, Blakely appeared in the "Armchair Theatre" series in 1962, episode "The Hard Knock" and director Charles Crichton unusually cast Blakely in two different roles during the same run of episodes of the 1967 series Man in a Suitcase.

In 1969, Blakely's controversial role as an anguished Jesus Christ in Dennis Potter's Son of Man gained him wide recognition. From that time onwards, he was a regular on British television, and in the same year played the leading role in a BBC adaptation of Anthony Trollope's The Way We Live Now.

Among the many stage plays in which he appeared were The Recruiting Officer, Saint Joan, The Royal Hunt of the Sun, Filumena Marturano, Volpone and Oedipus. He returned to the Royal Shakespeare in 1972 in Harold Pinter's Old Times and was subsequently in many West End plays.

Notable film roles included Maurice Braithwaite in This Sporting Life (1963), Vahlin in The Long Ships (1964), Sir Thomas More's house servant Matthew in A Man for All Seasons (1966), Dr. Watson to Robert Stephens's Holmes in Billy Wilder's The Private Life of Sherlock Holmes (1970), and Joseph Stalin in Jack Gold's Red Monarch (1983). In the 1975 British film, It Shouldn't Happen to a Vet, derived from the James Herriot books, Blakely played the eccentric Siegfried Farnon. (Blakely's Son of Man co-star Robert Hardy would play the role in the 1978-1990 BBC television series All Creatures Great and Small.)

Blakely also appeared in Young Winston (1972), The National Health (1973), Murder on the Orient Express (1974), The Pink Panther Strikes Again (1976), Equus (1977), The Dogs of War  (1980), Nijinsky (1980) and  Evil Under the Sun (1982).

A noted Shakespearean actor, Blakely appeared on television as Antony in Antony and Cleopatra (1981), directed by Jonathan Miller as part of the BBC Television Shakespeare series; and as Kent in the 1983 Granada Television version of King Lear which starred Laurence Olivier. Other television appearances included Loophole (1981), The Beiderbecke Affair (1985), Operation Julie (1985) and Paradise Postponed (1986).

Personal life
Blakely was married to British actress Margaret Whiting for 26 years and had three sons, including twins. He died of leukaemia at the peak of his career as a noted character actor, aged 56.

Filmography

 Saturday Night and Sunday Morning (1960) – Loudmouth
 The Hellions (1961) – Matthew Billings
 The Password Is Courage (1962) – 1st German Goon
 This Sporting Life (1963) – Maurice Braithwaite
 The Informers (1963) – Charlie Ruskin
 The Long Ships (1964) – Rhykka
 Never Put It in Writing (1964) – Oscar
 The Counterfeit Constable (1964) – L'aveugle
 A Man for All Seasons (1966) – Matthew
 The Spy with a Cold Nose (1966) – Russian Premier
 Charlie Bubbles (1967) – Smokey Pickles
 The Day the Fish Came Out (1967) – The Pilot
 The Vengeance of She (1968) – George
 Decline and Fall... of a Birdwatcher (1968) – Solomon Philbrick
 Alfred the Great (1969) – Asher
 The Private Life of Sherlock Holmes (1970) – Dr. Watson
 Something to Hide (1972) – Blagdon
 Young Winston (1972) – Butcher
 The National Health (1973) – Edward Loach
 Murder on the Orient Express (1974) – Cyrus B. Hardman
 Galileo (1975) – Priuli
 It Shouldn't Happen to a Vet (1975) – Siegfried Farnon
 The Pink Panther Strikes Again (1976) – Inspector Alec Drummond
 Equus (1977) – Frank Strang
 The Big Sleep (1978) – Harry Jones
 Meetings with Remarkable Men (1979) – Tamil
 The Day Christ Died - Caiphas
 Nijinsky (1980) – Vassili
 Little Lord Fauntleroy (1980) – Silas Hobbs
 The Dogs of War (1980) – North
 Loophole (1981) – Gardner
 Nailed (1981) – Elder Protestant
 Evil Under the Sun (1982) – Sir Horace Blatt
 Trail of the Pink Panther (1982) –  Inspector Alec Drummond (archive footage) (uncredited)
 Red Monarch (1983) - Stalin
 The World of Don Camillo (1984) – Peppone

References

External links

1930 births
1987 deaths
Male film actors from Northern Ireland
Male television actors from Northern Ireland
Male stage actors from Northern Ireland
Male Shakespearean actors from Northern Ireland
People educated at Sedbergh School
People from Bangor, County Down
Deaths from leukemia
Deaths from cancer in England
20th-century male actors from Northern Ireland
Royal Shakespeare Company members